GQ Australia is an Australian lifestyle publication and the Australian version of men's magazine GQ.

Published by NewsLifeMedia, a division of News Corp Australia, the print and digital men's title offers advice, news and features across style, grooming, watches, luxury, cars, politics and fitness.
GQ Australia first began as a printed publication in 1998 and now spans across stand-alone issues, mobile apps, social media platforms and the website GQ.com.au. With 8 issues printed every year, GQ also hosts events, the flagship of which is the GQ Men of the Year Awards.
GQ has spent two decades championing Australian creative talent and has interviewed many of the country's leading musicians, and Hollywood stars. Former cover stars include Hugh Jackman, Guy Pearce, George Clooney, Leonardo DiCaprio, Brad Pitt, Chris Pratt, Jake Gyllenhaal, Matt Damon, Liam Hemsworth, James Franco, Kit Harington and many more

GQ has interviewed many leading Australian political figures including prime ministers Kevin Rudd and Malcolm Turnbull, Foreign Minister Julie Bishop and Opposition Leader Bill Shorten alongside many state and federal MPs. In the case of Malcolm Turnbull, he appeared on the cover of GQ in 2015 beneath the headline "Primed Minister"

GQ Men of the Year
GQ's global forum for celebrating men and woman started in 2000 in Australia. With multiple award categories each year the black tie event showcases the best Australia has to offer when it comes to acting, music, business, culinary and creative talent.
A full list of previous winners includes
Previous Winners
2017 GQ Men of the Year Winners
Jeff Goldblum, Amber Heard, Travis Fimmel, Flume, Adam Briggs, Jon Kortajarena, Alan Joyce, KJ Apa, Ansel Elgort, A$AP Rocky, Virgil Abloh, Client Liaison, Jeff Horn, Hello Sunday Morning, Hayden Cox and Luke Davis 

2016 GQ Men of the Year Winners
Chris Hemsworth, Iggy Azalea, Joel Edgerton, Jon Hamm, Peter Greste, western Bulldogs, Kim Jones, Hacksaw Ridge, Kyle Chalmers, Darren Hart, Dylan Alcott, Joel Creasey, Stan Grant, Ken Done, Atlassian, Richard Roxburgh, Justin O’Shea and Keniyan Lonsdale 

2015 GQ Men of the Year Winners
Cody Simpson, David Gandy, Ruby Rose, David Pocock, Jai Courtney, Mick Fanning, Jordan Barrett, Michael Clarke, Waleed Aly, Ryan Corr, Joel & Benji Madden, Myuran Sukumaran, Daniel Johns, Guillaume Brahimi, Troye Sivan, Justin Hemmes and Patrick Johnson 

2014 GQ Men of the Year Winners
Ian Thorpe, Nick Boshier & Christiaan Van Vuuren, Daniel Ricciardo, Dave Franco, Neale Whitaker, Nick Palumbo, Fitzy & Wippa, Cheynne Tozzi, Don Hany, Nick Kyrgios, SAbour Bradley, Matt Moran, Vincent Fantauzzo, Jason Clarke, Strateas Carlucci, Brenton Thwaites, Clive Palmer, Jordan & Zac Stenmark, Hugh Evans, INXS, Love Your Sister, Animal Logic, The Preatures and Gough Whitlam (posthumous)

Subscriptions
GQ Australia offers readers annual and bi-annual subscriptions the magazine through their magazine distribution arm Mags Online  offering subscribers special edition and subscriber-only editions of the magazine.

Circulation
GQ is published in Australia, Brazil, Canada, China, France, Germany, India, Italy, Japan, Latin America, Mexico, Portugal, Romania, Russia, South Africa, South Korea, Spain, Taiwan, Thailand, Turkey, United Kingdom, and the United States.

Editors and publishers
AU. editors

 (2019–present) Jake Millar,
 (2017–2019) Michael Christensen, Editor 
(2015–2019) Jack Phillips, Digital Editor
(2019–present) Nikolina Ilic, Digital Editor
 (2016–2017) Matthew Drummond, Editor
 (2012–2014) Ceri David, Editor
 (2007–2012) Nick Smith, Editor
 (1998–1999) Peter Holder, Editor

AU. publishers
 (2018–present) Nicholas Gray
 (2012–2018) Nick Smith
 (1998–) Grant Pearce

Publication details
 GQ Australia. Vol. 1, no. 1 (September 1998–) (Also titled Gentlemen's Quarterly Australia) Greenwich, NSW: Condé Nast Publications Inc., 1998–
 Not published between December/January 1999/2000 and Special ed. (2001). Monthly, September 1998–December/January 1999/2000. ISSN 1440-7795

References

External links

Men's magazines published in Australia
GQ (magazine)
Men's fashion magazines
News Corp Australia
Magazines established in 1998
1998 establishments in Australia
Monthly magazines published in Australia
Bi-monthly magazines published in Australia
Magazines published in Sydney